Kenneth Perry is an American football coach. He began his head coaching career at Sam Houston High School in Arlington, Texas in 2000. After coaching there for 3 years, he left to coach at Haltom City in 2004. He coached the Buffs for two years before leaving for Arlington Bowie in 2006. He found his most success here, going 67–22 and earning a spot in the Class 5-A Texas High School Playoffs each year as head coach.

Coaching career
After a seven-year run with the Volunteers, Perry took the recruiting coach position and Director of High School Relations at TCU in 2013. In 2014, he became the cornerbacks coach for the Horned Frogs.

In January 2015, Perry was hired as the co-defensive coordinator and cornerbacks coach for the Kansas Jayhawks. Beginning in the 2017 season, Perry transitioned to Recruiting/Special Teams Coordinator.

Perry joined the XFL's Dallas Renegades as defensive backs coach in 2019.

On May 5, 2021, Perry was hired by SMU to be their Special Teams coach under head coach Sonny Dykes.

On November 29, 2021, Perry was hired by Texas Tech to be their special teams and running backs coach under head coach Joey McGuire.

References

Living people
American football defensive backs
Houston Cougars football players
Houston Cougars football coaches
TCU Horned Frogs football coaches
Kansas Jayhawks football coaches
Dallas Renegades coaches
Year of birth missing (living people)